Pityriasis rotunda  is a disorder of keratisation of the skin that manifests as a perfectly circular, scaly patches on the torso and proximal portions of the extremities. It may be associated with diseases like hepatocellular carcinoma in racially predisposed groups.

See also
 Skin lesion
 List of cutaneous conditions

References

External links 

Genodermatoses